Sheep, Dog 'n' Wolf (released as Looney Tunes: Sheep Raider in North America) is a puzzle-platformer stealth video game developed by Infogrames Lyon House and published by Infogrames for Microsoft Windows and PlayStation.

The game is based on the Warner Bros. series of Looney Tunes cartoons featuring Sam Sheepdog and Ralph Wolf. Controlling Ralph, the player must steal sheep from under Sam's nose while navigating through a series of levels, including two secret levels and a bonus level.

Plot
After another failed attempt at stealing a sheep from Sam Sheepdog, Ralph Wolf returns home after his shift to relax and enjoy some television in his chair. Daffy Duck bursts in and declares that Ralph is the newest contestant on the game show "Sheep, Dog, and Wolf" or as Daffy likes to call it, "Who Wants to Be a Sheep Stealer". In this show, Ralph is tasked with successfully stealing sheep from Sam in a variety of environments, though he is not allowed to harm the sheep in any way.

Despite many obstacles and encounters with various characters such as Porky Pig, Elmer Fudd, Yosemite Sam, Gossamer, Toro and Road Runner, Ralph is finally able to steal Sam's entire flock, but as he is declared the winner, Marvin the Martian gatecrashes the show, angry at Ralph and Daffy because a specific sheep that Ralph was forced to fire into the sky using Yosemite Sam's cannon in order to win actually landed on Planet X while Marvin was experimenting with his instant Martians, causing a serious accident which led to the Martians scattering across the planet. Marvin forcibly takes Ralph to Planet X with the task of recovering the Martians. Ralph eventually completes his task and is returned home by Marvin along with the stranded sheep. However, once inside, the sheep is revealed to be Sam in disguise, who grabs Ralph and prepares to vengefully beat him until Ralph's alarm clock sounds, and he wakes up from his sleep, revealing that the story's events were only a dream. Disappointed, Ralph goes outside to start another shift of sheep stealing from Sam.

Gameplay
The goal of each level is to steal one of the sheep from Sam Sheepdog's flock without him noticing and escort it to a marked area. Ralph is able to jump, tiptoe as to not make noise, and dash in case he needs to escape from danger. To aid Ralph in obtaining the sheep, Ralph can mail order various gadgets from Acme, such as rocket packs and dynamite. Certain items can be combined; for example, a fan can be used on a bottle of perfume to have its scent attract one of the sheep from afar. Ralph can also collect lettuces to lure the sheep towards places where Ralph is unable to carry them, such as on a weak bridge.

When approaching Sam, an icon shows up in the corner of the screen, showing that Ralph is in Sam's area. Sam's face shows where Sam's line of sight is, with the centre position looking in Ralph's direction. When it is green, Sam is unable to see or hear Ralph, but he is close to Sam's range. While it is orange, he is in Sam's area and Sam will be able to hear Ralph if he makes too much noise, and see him if he is not hidden in a bush or behind something. If Sam sees or hears Ralph, the icon will turn red and Sam will chase Ralph until he catches and punishes him, or Ralph escapes from his area. With almost each level passing, Sam becomes faster and faster, eventually faster than Ralph so more caution is needed when sneaking around in his area. Each level also has a hidden clock in machine to earn bonuses.

Reception

The game was met with positive to average reception upon release, as GameRankings gave it a score of 73.04% for the PlayStation version and 75.00% for the PC version, while Metacritic gave it 72 out of 100 for the former version.

References

External links

 
 

2001 video games
Surreal comedy
Slapstick comedy
Puzzle video games
Single-player video games
Stealth video games
Cartoon Network video games
Windows games
Infogrames games
3D platform games
PlayStation (console) games
Video games featuring Daffy Duck
Video games featuring the Tasmanian Devil (Looney Tunes)
Wile E. Coyote and the Road Runner
Video games about wolves
Video games about dogs
Fictional sheep
Anthropomorphic animals
Video games about dreams
Video games about revenge
Video games about time travel
Video games set in the United States
Farms in fiction
Video games set in forests
Mountains in fiction
Video games set in outer space
Video games set on fictional planets
Video games set in 2001
Video games developed in France
Video games with cel-shaded animation